Kulung is a Bantu language spoken in Nigeria.

Kulung can also refer to an unrelated Chadic language of the same name spoken in Karim Lamido LGA of Taraba State and related to Piya.

References
Notes

Bibliography
Adelberger, J. & Kleinewillinghöfer, U., 2016 A Kulung Vocabulary compiled by the missionary Ira McBride" Arbeitspapiere des Instituts für Ethnologie und Afrikastudien der Johannes Gutenberg-Universität Mainz (Working Papers of the Department of Anthropology and African Studies of the Johannes Gutenberg University Mainz) 167.

Jarawan languages
Languages of Nigeria